The City of New Orleans is an Amtrak passenger train which operates on an overnight schedule between Chicago and New Orleans. The train is a successor to the Illinois Central Railroad's Panama Limited.

The original City of New Orleans began in 1947 as part of the Illinois Central Railroad, and was the longest daylight run in the United States. The daylight train under that name ran through 1971, when it was moved to an overnight schedule as the Panama Limited. The present name was brought back in 1981, still on an overnight schedule.  The train is the subject of the bittersweet 1971 song "City of New Orleans", written by Steve Goodman.

The train operates along a route that has been served in one form or another for over a century. The Panama Limited originally ran from 1911 to 1971, though the IC ran Chicago-New Orleans trains since the turn of the century. Additional corridor service is provided between Chicago and Carbondale, Illinois–the northern leg of the route–by the Illini and Saluki.

During fiscal year 2018, the train carried 237,781 passengers, a decrease of 6.9% from FY2017. In FY2016, the train had a total revenue of $18,706,915, a 3.7% decrease from FY2015.

History

Illinois Central

The Illinois Central Railroad introduced the original City of New Orleans on April 27, 1947. It was a daytime, all-coach companion to the overnight  Panama Limited, which had been all-Pullman for most of its run. EMD E7 diesel locomotives pulled new lightweight Pullman Company coaches. The  route, which the City of New Orleans covered in 15 hours 55 minutes, was the longest daytime schedule in the United States. The City of New Orleans exchanged St. Louis—New Orleans through cars at Carbondale, Illinois and Louisville—New Orleans cars at Fulton, Kentucky. By October 25, 1959, the timetable had lengthened to 16 hours 30 minutes. The train remained popular throughout the 1960s and gained ex-Missouri Pacific Railroad dome coaches in 1967.

Amtrak
When Amtrak assumed operation of U.S. passenger train service on May 1, 1971, it dropped the Panama Limited in favor of retaining the City of New Orleans on the traditional daytime schedule. Inauspiciously, the City of New Orleans was involved in Amtrak's first fatal derailment on June 10, near Salem, Illinois. Because this train made no connections with other trains at either New Orleans or Chicago, Amtrak moved the train to an overnight schedule on November 14, 1971, and renamed it the Panama Limited.

In February 1981, Amtrak restored the City of New Orleans name while retaining the overnight schedule; Amtrak hoped to capitalize on the popularity of the song written by Steve Goodman and recorded in 1972 by Arlo Guthrie. A Kansas City section, the River Cities, began operation on April 29, 1984. It separated from the City of New Orleans at Centralia, Illinois (later Carbondale) and ran to Kansas City via St. Louis. This section ended on November 4, 1994. The northbound City of New Orleans began stopping at Gilman, Illinois, on October 26, 1986. Gilman had last seen service in 1971; the Illini stopped there as well. Service to Cairo, Illinois, south of Carbondale, ended on October 25, 1987.

Amtrak operated the City of New Orleans reliably through the 1980s and into the 1990s; in 1992, the City of New Orleans had the highest on-time performance rate of all Amtrak services at 87%. Nevertheless, on-board service had declined; Trains magazine editor J. David Ingles called the train "Amtrak's least-glamorous long-distance train". On March 3, 1994, new Superliner cars replaced the single-level cars. Real dining service returned; by the early 1990s an Amfleet dinette had doubled with the lounge car.

On September 10, 1995, the train was rerouted between Memphis and Jackson due to the Illinois Central's desire to abandon the original route (the Grenada District) in favor of the newer and flatter Yazoo District. Five towns in the Mississippi Delta lost service–Batesville, Grenada; Winona; Durant and Canton.

On March 15, 1999, the City of New Orleans collided with a flatbed semi-trailer near Bourbonnais. Of the 217 people aboard the train, eleven people were killed in the Bourbonnais train accident. The fourth car, where the fatalities occurred, was engulfed in flames following the collision at the crossing.

Because of damage in Mississippi and Louisiana due to Hurricane Katrina, Amtrak was forced in late August 2005 to truncate the City of New Orleans at Memphis, Tennessee. Service was first restored as far south as Hammond, Louisiana, and on October 8, 2005, Amtrak resumed service to New Orleans.  In December 2005 Arlo Guthrie, who helped popularize the song "City of New Orleans", led a fundraiser aboard the City of New Orleans and at several stops along the train's route to help in the hurricane recovery efforts.

The train began stopping at Marks, Mississippi on April 4, 2018 following the completion of a new station.

Starting October 1, 2019, traditional dining car services were removed and replaced with a reduced menu of 'Flexible Dining' options.

From October 1, 2020, to May 31, 2021, daily service was reduced to three trains per week due to the COVID-19 pandemic.

Route details

Upon Amtrak's creation in 1971, the City of New Orleans was one of four trains that called at Chicago's Central Station, which was originally Illinois Central's terminal in Chicago. All Amtrak trains were consolidated to Union Station by March 1972.

The tracks used were once part of the Illinois Central Railroad system, and are now owned by the Canadian National Railway (CN). The following lines are used:
St. Charles Air Line Railroad (IC), Chicago Union Station to the shore of Lake Michigan, now CN
Illinois Central Railroad Chicago Branch and main line, Chicago to Cairo, Illinois, now CN
Chicago, St. Louis and New Orleans Railroad (IC), Cairo to Fulton, Kentucky, now CN
Chesapeake, Ohio and Southwestern Railroad (IC), Fulton to Memphis, Tennessee, now CN
Yazoo and Mississippi Valley Railroad (IC), Memphis to Jackson, Mississippi, now CN
Chicago, St. Louis and New Orleans Railroad (IC), Jackson to New Orleans, Louisiana, now CN

In its present form, the southbound City of New Orleans leaves Chicago at 8 P.M. in the evening, traveling overnight through southern Illinois and Kentucky for arrival at breakfast time the following morning in Memphis, lunchtime in Jackson, and mid-afternoon in New Orleans. Northbound trains leave New Orleans in early afternoon, arriving in Jackson in early evening, then traveling through Tennessee and southern Illinois overnight before arriving in Champaign-Urbana at breakfast time the following morning and Chicago just after rush hour.

The train provides Tennessee's sole direct link to the Amtrak system; it serves the only two Amtrak stations in Tennessee, Newbern and Memphis.

In fiscal year 2004, the City of New Orleans achieved an on-time performance rating of 67.6%.  The train's average on-time performance rating for fiscal year 2006 was 86.8%, reaching as high as 93.5% for the month of May 2006.

In 2016, Amtrak released a study on bringing passenger rail to the Gulf Coast that recommended extending the City of New Orleans to Orlando, Florida along trackage once traversed by the Sunset Limited but unserved since Hurricane Katrina.

The Chicago Region Environmental and Transportation Efficiency Program (CREATE) is in the preliminary design phase for the Grand Crossing Project. This project will reroute the Illini, Saluki, and City of New Orleans trains from CN's tracks to Norfolk Southern's Chicago Line in the Greater Grand Crossing neighborhood in Chicago. This will eliminate a time-consuming switchback on the St. Charles Air Line into Chicago Union Station.

Equipment 
A typical City of New Orleans consist includes:
 GE Genesis/Siemens ALC-42 locomotive
 Viewliner Baggage car
 Superliner Transition-sleeper
 Superliner Sleeper
 Superliner Diner-Lounge
 Superliner Sightseer Lounge
 Superliner Coach
 Superliner Coach
 Superliner Coach-baggage

Folk song

"City of New Orleans" is a folk song written and first performed by Steve Goodman in 1970 and subsequently recorded by Arlo Guthrie in 1972. Many other artists, notably Willie Nelson, Johnny Cash, John Denver (with slightly different lyrics), Judy Collins, and Jerry Reed have also recorded it. The song lyrics trace the trail of the train route in mourning the "...disappearin' railroad blues...." 

Tom Rush performed and recorded a folk song (based on some Bukka White songs) about the Panama Limited, the overnight train along the same route as the City of New Orleans.

See also
Passenger train service on the Illinois Central Railroad

References

Notes

External links

Named passenger trains of the United States
Amtrak routes
Passenger trains of the Illinois Central Railroad
Passenger rail transportation in Illinois
Passenger rail transportation in Kentucky
Passenger rail transportation in Tennessee
Passenger rail transportation in Mississippi
Passenger rail transportation in Louisiana
Transportation in New Orleans
Night trains of the United States
Railway services introduced in 1947
Railway services introduced in 1981
Railway services discontinued in 1971
Long distance Amtrak routes